There are seven school districts in the province of New Brunswick, Canada.  The Minister of Education in New Brunswick is currently Bill Hogan, MLA for Carleton.

Current School Districts

History

Merging and renaming of 2012
As of September 2012, the Government of New Brunswick decided to merge and rename all the school districts changing the number of districts from 14 to 7.  By doing this, the provinces minister of education estimates $5 million would be saved in administrative costs. This was done by merging by language, francophone and anglophone as described below:
Anglophone West was created by merging districts 14, 17, and 18.
Anglophone South was created by merging districts 6, 8, and 10.
Anglophone East was previously known as district 2.
Anglophone North was created by merging districts 15 and 16. 
Francophone Sud was created by merging districts 1 and 11.
Francophone Nord-Ouest was previously known as district 3.
Francophone Nord-Est was created by merging districts 5 and 9.

See also
List of schools in New Brunswick
Administrative divisions of New Brunswick

References

External links
New Brunswick Department of Education and Early Childhood Development
New Brunswick Department of Education - Anglophone School Districts
New Brunswick Department of Education - Francophone School Districts
List of New Brunswick School Websites

 
Education in New Brunswick
School districts
New Brunswick